George Wallerstein (January 13, 1930 – May 13, 2021) was a United States astronomer who researched the chemical composition of stellar atmospheres. The son of German immigrants, he was raised in New York City during the Great Depression. In school he developed an interest in boxing and won the senior class boxing award. He graduated from Brown University in 1951 before receiving his M.S. and Ph.D. from  the California Institute of Technology. He served in the Navy during the Korean War, then, after teaching at the University of California, joined the astronomy department of the University of Washington in 1965. In March 1998, he retired from the University and was appointed Professor Emeritus. At the time of his death, he was married to the astronomer Julie Lutz.

In 2002, he won the Henry Norris Russell Lectureship. In 2004, he was presented the President's Award by the United Negro College Fund for his contributions to diversity. He served on the Board of Directors for the NAACP Legal Defense Fund and the National Advisory Board of the Center for Arms Control and Non-Proliferation, the research arm of Council for a Livable World.

He was elected a Legacy Fellow of the American Astronomical Society in 2020.

References

American astronomers
California Institute of Technology alumni
 University of Washington faculty
Brown University alumni
Fellows of the American Astronomical Society
1930 births
2021 deaths